Patricia Calton (19 September 1948 – 29 May 2005) was a British Liberal Democrat politician who served as Member of Parliament (MP) for Cheadle in Greater Manchester.

She was first elected at the 2001 general election, with a 33-vote majority over the sitting Conservative MP Stephen Day.  She held  her seat in the 2005 general election with a majority of 4,020 votes over Stephen Day, despite being too ill with cancer to campaign personally.  She died less than four weeks later, although she was sworn in as an MP five days before her death.  She also stood at the 1992 general election and the 1997 general election.  She had previously been a deputy leader of Stockport Metropolitan Borough Council. She is, to date, the only Liberal Democrat MP to have died in office since the party's foundation in 1988.

Biography
Calton was born into a Royal Air Force family and as a result moved around frequently as a child. She began her schooling in Egypt while her father was posted there but most of her school days were spent at Wymondham College in Norfolk.

After her degree in biochemistry at the University of Manchester Institute of Science and Technology (UMIST), she took a Postgraduate Certificate in Education at the University of Manchester.

Either side of a career break while bringing up her family, she taught Chemistry in comprehensive schools in Greater Manchester and Cheshire.  In June 2001 she left teaching for Parliament, her last school being Poynton High School, where she was head of Chemistry and head of Legh House.

In Parliament, she was a Liberal Democrat spokeswoman on Northern Ireland and on health, and was also chair of the all-party group on breast cancer.

She was married to her husband Clive in 1969. They had three children; Libby, Andrew and Catherine and one grandchild named Bethany. The family lived in Bramhall for most of their married life and all the children were educated at local schools — Pownall Green Primary and Bramhall High School — and then at Stockport's sixth form colleges.

Calton was first diagnosed with breast cancer following the 1997 election campaign. She recovered after she had undergone a double mastectomy the same year. She ran the London Marathon four times to raise money for Macmillan Nurses. In February 2005 the cancer recurred, this time in the spine. She died in Stockport on 29 May 2005.
A few days before her death, she entered the House of Commons in a wheelchair to affirm her allegiance.  Speaker Michael Martin broke with tradition, leaving the Speaker's Chair to shake Calton's hand, said "welcome home Patsy," and kissed her cheek.

After her death, Breakthrough Breast Cancer established the Breakthrough Patsy Calton Award in her honour to recognise exceptional achievement by parliamentarians in campaigning for improvements in breast cancer research, services and/or the patient experience.

References

External links
ePolitix.com - Patsy Calton MP
Guardian Unlimited Politics - Ask Aristotle: Mrs Patsy Calton MP
TheyWorkForYou.com - Patsy Calton MP
The Public Whip - Patsy Calton MP voting record
BBC News - Patsy Calton profile 10 February 2005
BBC News Guardian Unlimited Manchester Evening News Telegraph Libdems.org coverage of her death
Guardian Obituary: "Courageous Lib Dem MP known for her health campaigns"
Independent Obituary: "Energetic Liberal Democrat MP for Cheadle"

1948 births
2005 deaths
Liberal Democrats (UK) MPs for English constituencies
Female members of the Parliament of the United Kingdom for English constituencies
Councillors in Stockport
UK MPs 2001–2005
UK MPs 2005–2010
Deaths from cancer in England
People educated at Wymondham College
Liberal Democrats (UK) councillors
21st-century British women politicians
20th-century British women politicians
Members of the Parliament of the United Kingdom for Cheadle
20th-century English women
20th-century English people
21st-century English women
21st-century English people
Women councillors in England